Koottu is a 2004 Indian Malayalam-language film, directed by Jayaprakash. The movie was produced by Asharaf Liwa, Faisal Babu and Muneer K. under the banner of Liwa Films International. The film stars Richard Rishi, Aravind Akash, Sai Kumar, Manoj K. Jayan and Thilakan. The film was shot in St. Josephs Devigiri College, Kozhikode

Cast

Richard Rishi as Harikrishnan 
Aravind Akash as Balagopal 
Sai Kumar as SP Vishwambharan 
Manoj K. Jayan as Hameed Khan 
Ambika as Sabitha Devi
Lena as Parvathi 
Prasanth as Ratheesh
Shobha Mohan 
Thilakan as Dr. Hariharan 
Shammi Thilakan as Joseph 
Vijayaraghavan as Akbar 
Jagadish as Xavier 
Sukumari as Balagopal's grandmother
Prem Kumar as W. J. Napoleon

Production
After the failure of Kadhal Virus, Richard wanted to try his luck with Malayalam cinema.

Soundtrack
The music was composed by Mohan Sithara.

References

External links
  
 

2004 films
Films scored by Mohan Sithara
2000s Malayalam-language films